Trevor Kenneth Rosier (born 14 January 1943) is a former English cricketer.  Rosier was a right-handed batsman who bowled right-arm medium.  He was born in Stockwell, London.

Rosier made his debut for Bedfordshire against Cambridgeshire in the 1968 Minor Counties Championship.  He played 22 matches of Minor counties cricket for Bedfordshire from 1968 to 1973. At the end of the 1972 season, when Bedfordshire challenged Yorkshire Second XI for the championship, he took 8 for 38 in Yorkshire's first innings and then scored 118 in Bedfordshire's reply; Bedfordshire went on to win by three wickets to secure their second Minor Counties Championship.

He made his List A debut against Dorset in the 1st round of the 1968 Gillette Cup.  He made 2 further List A appearances, against Hampshire in the 2nd round of the same competition and Lancashire in the 1973 Gillette Cup.  In his 3 List A matches for Bedfordshire, he scored 82 runs at an average of 27.33, with a high score of 52.  This score came against Hampshire.  With the ball, he took 5 wickets at a bowling average of 25.00, with best figures of 3/22.

He also made List A appearances for Minor Counties South, playing 2 matches in the 1973 Benson & Hedges Cup against Hampshire and Somerset.  He scored 22 runs in these matches, which came at an average of 11.00 with a high score of 19.  With the ball, he bowled 18 wicket-less overs.

References

External links

1943 births
Living people
People from Stockwell
Cricketers from Greater London
English cricketers
Bedfordshire cricketers
Minor Counties cricketers